Zonoplusia ochreata a species of moth in the family Noctuidae. It was first described by Francis Walker in 1865. It is found in the Oriental tropics of India, Sri Lanka, north to Japan, east to Hong Kong, Sundaland and the Philippines. The species is also known from the Australian state of Queensland.

Description
The wingspan of this moth is 24–26 mm. It has palpi with a short third joint. The hind femur of the male is not tufted with long hair. Its thorax is suffused with fiery orange. Its forewings are of a copper colour confined to the apical part of outer area. The stigma consists of a fuscous and white streak from the costa at the anteromedial line to the post medial lines at vein 2, these being almost erect and the latter sinuous.

The larvae feed on Polygonum species.

References

External links
Australian Faunal Directory
Japanese Moths

Moths of Australia
Plusiinae
Moths of Asia
Moths of Japan
Moths of the Philippines
Moths described in 1865